This is a list of mayors of Calgary, Alberta, Canada.

List of Mayors of Calgary

See also 
List of Calgary municipal elections
Calgary City Council

Notes

References

Sources
Biographies of Calgary's mayors from the City of Calgary web page

 
Mayors Of Calgary
Calgary